Scott's mouse-eared bat (Myotis scotti) is a species of vesper bat. It is found only in Ethiopia, in subtropical or tropical moist montane forests and shrubland. It is threatened by habitat loss.

Taxonomy and etymology
Scott's mouse-eared bat was described as a new species in 1927 by British zoologist Oldfield Thomas.
The eponym for the species name "scotti" was H. H. Scott.
Scott had obtained the holotype near Addis Ababa, Ethiopia.

References

Mouse-eared bats
Mammals of Ethiopia
Endemic fauna of Ethiopia
Taxonomy articles created by Polbot
Mammals described in 1927
Taxa named by Oldfield Thomas
Bats of Africa